Cannington was a provincial electoral district  for the Legislative Assembly of the province of Saskatchewan, Canada. This district was one of 25 created for the 1st Saskatchewan general election in 1905. It was preceded by a Territorial constituency of the same name. The constituency was combined with the "Souris" district of Souris-Estevan (and renamed "Souris-Cannington"), and lost parts to Moosomin, Indian Head-Wolseley, Weyburn and Estevan before the 18th Saskatchewan general election in 1975.

It was the riding of Premier William John Patterson.

Members of the Legislative Assembly

Election results

|-

|Provincial Rights
|Ewan Cameron McDiarmid
|align="right"|1,068
|align="right"|48.00%
|align="right"|–
|- bgcolor="white"
!align="left" colspan=3|Total
!align="right"|2,225
!align="right"|100.00%
!align="right"|

|-

|Provincial Rights
|Peter McSuman
|align="right"|996
|align="right"|45.92%
|align="right"|-2.08
|- bgcolor="white"
!align="left" colspan=3|Total
!align="right"|2,169
!align="right"|100.00%
!align="right"|

|-

|Conservative
|Charles Edward D. Wood
|align="right"|688
|align="right"|35.72%
|align="right"|-10.20
|- bgcolor="white"
!align="left" colspan=3|Total
!align="right"|1,926
!align="right"|100.00%
!align="right"|

|-

|Conservative
|William Mauson Connor
|align="right"|1,174
|align="right"|37.93%
|align="right"|+2.21
|- bgcolor="white"
!align="left" colspan=3|Total
!align="right"|3,095
!align="right"|100.00%
!align="right"|

|-

|Independent
|George W. Stockton
|align="right"|878
|align="right"|35.35%
|align="right"|–
|- bgcolor="white"
!align="left" colspan=3|Total
!align="right"|2,484
!align="right"|100.00%
!align="right"|

|-

|- bgcolor="white"
!align="left" colspan=3|Total
!align="right"|Acclamation
!align="right"|

|-

|Independent
|William Henry Bagot
|align="right"|969
|align="right"|36.77%
|align="right"|-
|- bgcolor="white"
!align="left" colspan=3|Total
!align="right"|2,635
!align="right"|100.00%
!align="right"|

|-

|style="width: 130px"|Independent
|Samson Wallace Arthur
|align="right"|1,913
|align="right"|50.34%
|align="right"|+13.57

|- bgcolor="white"
!align="left" colspan=3|Total
!align="right"|3,800
!align="right"|100.00%
!align="right"|

|-

|Farmer-Labour
|Donald K. Cameron
|align="right"|2,152
|align="right"|25.47%
|align="right"|–

|Conservative
|Samson Wallace Arthur
|align="right"|2,075
|align="right"|24.56%
|align="right"|-25.78
|- bgcolor="white"
!align="left" colspan=3|Total
!align="right"|8,449
!align="right"|100.00%
!align="right"|

|-

|CCF
|Gladys Strum
|align="right"|3,477
|align="right"|43.74%
|align="right"|+18.27
|- bgcolor="white"
!align="left" colspan=3|Total
!align="right"|7,950
!align="right"|100.00%
!align="right"|

|-

|CCF
|Gladys Strum
|align="right"|3,204
|align="right"|45.12%
|align="right"|+1.38

|Prog. Conservative
|William A. Brigden
|align="right"|687
|align="right"|9.68%
|align="right"|-
|- bgcolor="white"
!align="left" colspan=3|Total
!align="right"|7,101
!align="right"|100.00%
!align="right"|

|-

|CCF
|Ralph Hjertaas
|align="right"|3,422
|align="right"|39.75%
|align="right"|-5.37

|- bgcolor="white"
!align="left" colspan=3|Total
!align="right"|8,609
!align="right"|100.00%
!align="right"|

|-

|CCF
|Edward G. McCullough
|align="right"|3,569
|align="right"|45.94%
|align="right"|+6.19
|- bgcolor="white"
!align="left" colspan=3|Total
!align="right"|7,769
!align="right"|100.00%
!align="right"|

|-

|CCF
|William J. G. Sawyer
|align="right"|4,147
|align="right"|47.62%
|align="right"|+1.68
|- bgcolor="white"
!align="left" colspan=3|Total
!align="right"|8,709
!align="right"|100.00%
!align="right"|

|-

|CCF
|William J. G. Sawyer
|align="right"|2,843
|align="right"|35.17%
|align="right"|-12.45

|- bgcolor="white"
!align="left" colspan=3|Total
!align="right"|8,084
!align="right"|100.00%
!align="right"|

|-

|CCF
|Edward G. McCullough
|align="right"|2,789
|align="right"|33.08%
|align="right"|-2.09

|Prog. Conservative
|Harvey Reid
|align="right"|838
|align="right"|9.94%
|align="right"|-

|Independent
|George J. Tkach
|align="right"|95
|align="right"|1.13%
|align="right"|-
|- bgcolor="white"
!align="left" colspan=3|Total
!align="right"|8,431
!align="right"|100.00%
!align="right"|

|-

|CCF
|Henry G. Doty
|align="right"|2,489
|align="right"|30.14%
|align="right"|-2.94

|Prog. Conservative
|Glenn Brimner
|align="right"|1,917
|align="right"|23.21%
|align="right"|+13.27
|- bgcolor="white"
!align="left" colspan=3|Total
!align="right"|8,258
!align="right"|100.00%
!align="right"|

|-

|NDP
|Stanley G. Barnard
|align="right"|2,377
|align="right"|32.79%
|align="right"|+2.65

|Prog. Conservative
|Glenn Brimner
|align="right"|1,436
|align="right"|19.81%
|align="right"|-3.40
|- bgcolor="white"
!align="left" colspan=3|Total
!align="right"|7,249
!align="right"|100.00%
!align="right"|

|-

|NDP
|James T. Eaton
|align="right"|3,682
|align="right"|48.86%
|align="right"|+16.07
|- bgcolor="white"
!align="left" colspan=3|Total
!align="right"|7,536
!align="right"|100.00%
!align="right"|

See also
Electoral district (Canada)
List of Saskatchewan provincial electoral districts
List of Saskatchewan general elections
List of political parties in Saskatchewan
Cannington Manor Provincial Historic Site

References
Saskatchewan Archives Board – Saskatchewan Election Results By Electoral Division

Former provincial electoral districts of Saskatchewan